Jacob Vestergaard (born 7 April 1961 in Tvøroyri, Faroe Islands, grew up in and lives in Akrar) is a Faroese politician. He has been Minister of Fisheries of the Faroe Islands three times, last time was from 2012 to 2015. Before he became a politician he worked as a policeman. He is married to Sólfríð Vestergaard, together they have four children.

Political career 
Vestergaard's political career started the 1990s in the Town Council of Sumba, where he was elected mayor from 1 January 1993 until February 2003 and again from 1 January 2004 until 31 December 2004. He was president of  Føroya Kommunufelag from 2001-03. He was elected for the Faroese parliament in January 2008 for the first time representing the People's Party (Fólkaflokkurin). He was elected with 870 votes and was number four of all elected members and number one of his party. In 2011 he was reelected with 1048 votes, which was second most votes of the candidates of the People's Party. Vestergaard was Minister of Internal Affairs from 1 December 2005 until 23 November 2007 and Minister of Fisheries three times, from 2003 to 2004 and 2008 to 2011 and again from 16 February 2012 until present.

References 

Fisheries Ministers of the Faroe Islands
Ministers of Internal Affairs of the Faroe Islands
Members of the Løgting
People's Party (Faroe Islands) politicians
1961 births
Living people